Emily Miles (1910-1999) was an African American fashion designer and entrepreneur. She was considered Newark, New Jersey's "first lady of fashion" and "the grand dame of black style in Newark". In 1998 she was inducted into the New Jersey Women's Hall of Fame.

Early life 
Emily Miles was born Emma Rollins on July 31, 1910 in Chattanooga, Tennessee, the second of ten children. She graduated Central High School in Newark in August 1929. Miles attended Howard University. After graduating Howard she modeled internationally, including serving as a stand-in for Josephine Baker, marrying businessman Milton Miles on her travels. She then attended various fashion schools in New York City including Pratt Institute, Parsons School of Design and Fashion Institute. She began designing hats and in 1952 she won the Paper-Dress Ball in Newark sponsored by the NAACP.

Charm school 
After graduating from school in New York Miles bought up a 22 room mansion in Newark (803 South 10th Street, between Madison and Clinton Avenues) with a small studio for design and opened "Belle Meade Charm School". The Charm School trained more than 1,000 women and girls including Whitney Houston and was open for almost fifty years. It was called "one of the most enduring establishments in the New York City area". The Charm School was active as a modeling agency as early as 1950.

Fashion career 
Besides her charm school, Miles continued to design fashion and organize shows. She was most famous for her hats and by 1983 her traveling fashion shows were booked two years out. She stated "a woman's outfit was always incomplete without a...hat". She showed her designs many times in the Ebony Fashion Fair. She also had annual shows in Newark at The Robert Treat Hotel grand ballroom and the Terrance ballroom. She also produced fashion shows and shared the stage with prominent names. In 1962 in Merchantville, NJ she co-hosted the "Ella Fitzgerald and Emily Miles Luncheon and Fashion Show". She has been featured in various books about African American fashion including African American Dress and Adornment: a Cultural Perspective, Black and Beautiful: How Women of Color Changed the Fashion Industry and Skin Deep: Inside the World of Black Fashion Models. “What Miles produces", wrote one New Jersey newspaperwoman, “is a personal extravaganza, a production in which all the clothes are her own designs, all the models trainees or graduates of her own Belle Meade Modeling School."

References 

1910 births
1999 deaths
American fashion designers
People from Newark, New Jersey
African-American fashion designers